D.950 is a north to south state road in east Turkey. It starts at Hopa at the Black Sea coast and ends at the Syrian border. It crosses many state roads (like ,   and ).

Itinerary

References

950
Transport in Artvin Province
Transport in Erzurum Province
Transport in Bingöl Province
Transport in Diyarbakır Province
Transport in Mardin Province